"Time" is the second single from Canadian country singer Dean Brody's album Beautiful Freakshow (2016). The song was released with its album through Open Road Recordings and was released as a single on November 18, 2016.

Background
Prior to the single's official release, "Time" was released before the album's release to iTunes as a promotional single.

The song describes three stories of people who let time slip by, including a high school graduate reminiscing about younger days; a father who never had time to attend his son's baseball games; and a girl who ignored her grandfather on fishing trips.

Commercial performance
As of December 2016, the song had received 250,000 streams through Spotify.

Music video
An accompanying music video directed by Stephano Barberis premiered on December 8, 2016. The video features personal stories about the importance of spending time with loved ones interspersed with footage of Brody singing, and was filmed in British Columbia.

Chart performance

Year-end charts

References

2016 songs
2016 singles
Dean Brody songs
Open Road Recordings singles
Country ballads
Songs written by Dean Brody
Music videos directed by Stephano Barberis